The North Caucasus Military District was a military district of the Russian Armed Forces, which became in 2010 the Southern Military District and lately also included the Black Sea Fleet and Caspian Flotilla.

It comprised the Republic of Adygeya, the Republic of Dagestan, the Republic of Ingushetia, the Kabardino-Balkar Republic, the Republic of Kalmykia, the Karachay–Cherkess Republic, the Republic of North Osetia-Alaniya, the Chechen Republic, Krasnodar Krai, Stavropol Krai, and Astrakhan, Volgograd, and Rostov oblasts. It has the same borders as the Southern Federal District. Its last commander was Lieutenant General Alexander Galkin, appointed from January 2010.

History

The District was originally established on 4 May 1918, and reorganized as a field formation during the Russian Civil War. The First Cavalry Army was formed in the District in November 1919. The District was reformed in the early 1920s with its headquarters at Rostov. Kliment Voroshilov was made district commander. During the 1920s and 1930s, the District became home to many training establishments, which were to multiply greatly during the Second World War.

In June 1941 the district's first line troops comprised the 64th Rifle Corps commanded by Major General A.D. Kuleshov with the 165th and 175th Rifle Divisions, the 26th Mechanised Corps with the 52nd and 56th Tank Divisions and the 103rd Mechanised Division, the 28th Mountain Rifle Division, and the 157th Rifle Division.  The 19th Army was formed in the District in May–June 1941 under former district commander Ivan Konev and was engaged against the Germans from the beginning of Operation Barbarossa. 50th and 53rd Cavalry Divisions were also formed here, joining the Soviet Western Front.

Later the District saw battles around Rostov in November 1941 where the Germans suffered defeat, and the Battle of Stalingrad, which has been described as the most ferocious battle to date. Following the conclusion of the Battle of the Caucasus, the North Caucasian Front and the headquarters of the 56th Army were disbanded in accordance with a Supreme Command directive of the 20 November 1943. The Independent Coastal Army was formed, for the second time, on their base.

The 68th, 76th, 77th, 78th, 79th, 80th, 81st, 82nd and 83rd Naval Rifle Brigades were formed in the district after a November–December 1941 People's Commissariat for Defence resolution.

Immediately following the war, to demobilize the force, on 9 July 1945 the territory was split into three military districts: Don, Stavropol, and the Kuban.
 
 The Stavropol Military District consisted of Stavropol Krai, Grozny Oblast, Kabardino-Balkar ASSR, and the North Ossetian Autonomous Soviet Socialist Republic. Holm writes the district headquarters was formed in July 1945 from the headquarters of the 59th Combined Arms Army and HQ 1st Guards Horse-Mechanised Group. The 19th Rifle Division arrived in the district in late 1945. In accordance with an order of the Central Group of Forces (the Soviet garrison in Austria and Czechoslovakia), the 252nd Rifle Division was transported by rail to the Soviet Union via Kaposvár, Budapest, Sighet, Rostov, and Mineralnye Vody, with the rest of the 23rd Rifle Corps from 20 December 1945. On arrival the 23rd Rifle Corps was renumbered as the 60th Rifle Corps. By February 15, 1946 the 252nd Rifle Division had fully arrived in the Stavropol Military District (merged into the North Caucasus Military District shortly afterwards). 
 The Kuban Military District comprised the territory of Krasnodar Krai (formed by the headquarters of the 60th Army). The Kuban Military District comprised the 29th Rifle Corps (73rd, 102nd Rifle Division and 217th Rifle Divisions), as well as the 9th Rifle Division. By summer 1946 the 29th Rifle Corps had been reduced to commanding the 8th, 9th, and 39th Independent Rifle Brigades. They were reexpanded into divisions in 1951.
 The Don Military District was located in the territory of the Rostov, Stalingrad, and Astrakhan Oblasts. The staff of the Don Military District was located in Rostov-on-Don, and was considered the heir of the traditions of the North Caucasus Military District. Among the formations in the Don Military District was the 6th Rifle Corps, which had arrived from Latvia in 1945. In early 1946 its three rifle divisions were reduced to independent rifle brigades (the 15th, 18th, and 46th, though the 15th disbanded in 1947).

In 1946 the Don Military District was renamed again as the North Caucasian Military District. The official Russian military website notes the work of the soldiers of the district in helping repair the ravages of the war.

The important Kapustin Yar test range was created in the District following the war.

In 1955 the district's forces included the 6th Rifle Corps (68th Mechanised Division and 372nd, soon to become 68th, Rifle Division). Other forces included the 29th Rifle Corps, 9th Rifle, 19th Rifle, 24th Guards Rifle, 46th Rifle, and 73rd Mountain Rifle Division, and the 1st Guards Tank Division.

In 1957 the 12th Rifle Corps became the 12th Army Corps (Soviet Union). At the time it controlled the 42nd Guards Motor Rifle Division and the 92nd Motor Rifle Division (Ordzhonikidze, Severo-Osetinskaya ASSR), which became the 19th MRD in 1964. In 1957 the 29th Rifle Corps became the 29th Army Corps (9th and 73rd Motor Rifle Divisions), but eleven years later it was moved to Belogorsk, Amur Oblast, in the Far East Military District. In addition, there was the 18th Guards Heavy Tank Division at Novocherkassk.

The 18th Guards HTD was involved in the Novocherkassk massacre in 1962. During the massacre, as the first deputy commander of the North Caucasian Military District, Lieutenant General Matvey Shaposhnikov refused to comply with the order to attack the demonstrators with tanks. Shaposhnikov was later expelled from the Communist Party for his criticism of the massacre. 

The District was awarded the Order of the Red Banner in 1968.

In 1974 the 14th Tank Division was established at Novocherkassk, to replace the 51st Tank Division which was moving to Mongolia.

In 1979 Scott and Scott reported the District's HQ address as Rostov-na-Donu 18, Ulitsa Tekucheva, Dom 135.

In 1980 the 12th Army Corps controlled the 9th Motor Rifle Division (Maykop), the 156th Motor Rifle Division (mobilisation) (Novorossiysk), and the 113th Motor Rifle Division (mobilisation) at Goryachiy Klyuch, Krasnodar Krai. The 113th Motor Rifle Division was formed in 1978, and in 1981 moved to Molkino, Krasnodar Krai. The same year, the 34th Army Corps controlled the 82nd Motor Rifle Division (Volvograd) and 197th Motor Rifle Division (Uryupinsk).

In the District in 1988-89 were the 128th cadre Air Assault Brigade at Stavropol, subordinated directly to Army General  and his High Command of the Southern Military Direction at Baku; the 173rd Guards District Training Centre at Groznyy (the former 42nd Training MRD renamed in 1987), the 14th Tank Division, and the 110th Guards Artillery Division, other smaller formations and units all under district control, plus the formations and units in the 12th, 34th, and 42nd Army Corps. The 110th Guards Artillery Division had been established in 1966 by being upgraded from brigade status.

Post 1989

In 1989, the 14th Tank Division was transferred to the MVD, and retitled as the 100th Motorised Division for Special Use MVD. Later the 100th Division was reduced in status to the 50th Separate Brigade of Operational Designation MVD (:ru:50-я отдельная бригада оперативного назначения), now part of the National Guard of Russia.

The official website underlines the importance of the District as a border formation with the task of securing the southern boundary of the Russian Federation. The first conflict the District became involved in during the post Soviet period was the attempted secession of South Ossetia from Georgia to join North Ossetia, which is a federal subject of the Russian Federation. Soldiers from the District became involved in protecting installation in Vladikavkaz from irregular fighters in late 1992.

In 1990, there were three army corps in the district. The 12th Army Corps at Krasnodar, briefly to become the 49th Army, commanded the 9th Motor Rifle Division, the 42nd Army Corps at Vladikavkaz commanded the 19th Motor Rifle Division, and the 34th Army Corps at Volgograd commanded the 82nd Motor Rifle Division. Units directly under district command included the 110th Guards Artillery Division at Buynaksk, the 173rd District Training Centre at Groznyy one SSM, one SAM, one artillery, and one pipeline brigade. There were also reserve (no equipment) units: an artillery brigade, an anti-tank brigade, and a SAM brigade. From late 1991 into 1992 the 173rd Guards District Training Centre suffered huge losses of equipment to Chechen militants as it was pillaged in the process of removal of weapons to the Russian Federation proper; it was formally disbanded on 4 January 1992.

The former 8th Guards Army of Stalingrad fame, was withdrawn from East Germany to the site of its greatest victory, now named Volgograd, in May 1993. While being transferred to the Caucasus, it became 8th Guards Army Corps.

On December 1, 1993, the 136th Motor Rifle Brigade was established at Buynaksk, Dagestan. In 1996-97, the brigade was merged with the 204th Guards Motor Rifle Regiment "Uman-Berlin" as the 136th Guards Motor Rifle Brigade. The 204th Guards Motor Rifle Regiment was transferred to the North Caucasus at some point during the transformation of the 94th Guards Motor Rifle Division, returning from the GSFG, to become the 74th Guards Motor Rifle Brigade in the Siberian Military District.

The 58th Army's creation was announced on April 26, 1995; previously there had only been corps headquarters in the District (and the 58th was formed from the previous 42nd Army Corps headquarters). 8th Guards Army Corps was disbanded in 1998.

In 2006 the District included the 42nd Guards Motor Rifle Division at Khankala, in the environs of Grozny in Chechniya, the 20th "Prikarpatsko-Berlinskaya" Guards Motor Rifle Division (which may have absorbed the 56th Guards Air Assault Brigade), the 33rd Independent Motor Rifle Regiment (Volgograd), the 131st Motor Rifle Brigade (Maykop – former 9 MRD), the 58th Army (headquarters at Vladikavkaz) with the 19th Motor Rifle Division, 136th "Umansko-Berlinskaya" Independent Guards Motor Rifle Brigade, and other brigades and regiments, the 4th Air Army, the Transcaucasus Group of Forces, the Caspian Flotilla, and other formations and units. These other formations and units included the newly forming 33rd and 34th Independent Motor Rifle Brigades (Mountain).

The District was the primary Russian military formation responsible for managing the Chechen conflict throughout the First and Second Chechen Wars. Insurgent activity slowly decreased in the early 2000s. Twenty-six soldiers won the star of the Hero of the Russian Federation in the first war, and 43 in the second.

In the first decade of the 21st century, the Armed Forces did not have the primary role in directing the anti-terrorist effort in the North Caucasus region. The Regional Operational Headquarters (ROSh), chaired by the Deputy Director FSB RF (Head of the department for protection of the constitutional structure and the campaign against terrorism) directed and conducted the counter-terrorist operation. Subordinated to it was the Combined Grouping of Troops (OGV) in the North Caucasus drawing on the Armed Forces, the Interior Troops, the FSB, and other agencies.

During the 2008 South Ossetia War, troops from this district were involved in combat operations in South Ossetia and inside Georgian territory.

The Southern Military District was formed on October 22, 2010, and the North Caucasus Military District was disbanded.
Lieutenant General Alexander Galkin took command of the Southern Military District.

Commanders (1918–2010)

 1918–18: Andrei Snesarev 
 1918–18: A. N. Kovalevsky
 1918–18: Kliment Voroshilov
 1920: Georgy Bazilevich
 1921–24: Kliment Voroshilov
 1924–25: Nikolay Muralov
 1925–27: Ieronim Uborevich
 1927–31: Ivan Panfilovich Belov
 1931–37: Nikolai Kashirin
 1937–38: Sergei Efimovich Gribov
 1938–40: Vladimir Kachalov
 1940: Mikhail Grigoryevich Yefremov
 1940–41: Fyodor Kuznetsov
 1941–42: Vsevolod Sergeyev
 4 February 1946 – 19 April 1948: General-Lieutenant P.A. Belov
 20 April 1948 – 16 May 1949: Colonel General Vladimir Romanovsky
 17 May 1949 – 19 April 1953: Colonel General Sergei Trofimenko
 April 1953-November 1953: General Colonel Nikolay Pukhov
 1953–58: Marshal of the Soviet Union Andrei Ivanovich Yeremenko (Nov 53 – Apr 58)
 1958–68: Army General Issa Alexandrovich Pliyev
 1968–70: Army General Alexander Terentyevich Altunin
 1970–76: Colonel General Dmitry Litovtsev
 1976 – August 1979: Colonel General of Tanks Valery Belikov
 August 1979 – 1980: Colonel General Stanislav Postnikov
 1980 – August 1984: Colonel General Vladimir Meretskov
 August 1984 – July 1986: Colonel General Viktor Skokov
 July 1986 – June 1993: Colonel General Lev Shustko
 June 1993 – December 1994: Colonel General Alexey Mityukhin
 February 1995 – May 1997: Colonel General Anatoly Kvashnin
 July 1997 – May 2000: Army General Viktor Kazantsev
 May 2000 – December 2002 Colonel General Gennady Troshev
 December 2002 – July 2004: Army General Vladimir Boldyrev
 July 2004 – May 2008: Army General Alexander Ivanovich Baranov
 May 2008 – January 2010: Colonel General Sergey Makarov
 January – September 2010: Lieutenant General Alexander Galkin

Commanders of the Don Military District 
July 1945 – February 1946: Colonel General Pavel Belov
June 1949 – December 1951: Colonel General Vladimir Romanovsky
December 1951 – November 1953: Colonel General Nikanor Zakhvatayev

Commander of the Kuban Military District 
 1945–46: Colonel General Pavel Kurochkin

Commanders of the troops of the Stavropol Military District 
 July 1945 – February 1946: Lieutenant General Ivan Korovnikov
 March – May 1946: Lieutenant General Vsevolod Yakovlev (interim)

Units and formations 

Order of the Red Banner North Caucasus Military District 2010:
 Combat formations:
 8th Guards Independent (Mountain) Motor-Rifle Brigade "Shavlinskayy", in Borzoy equipped with BMP
 10th Independent Spetsnaz Brigade, in Molkino
 17th Guards Independent Motor-Rifle Brigade, in Shali equipped with MT-LBV
 18th Guards Independent Motor-Rifle Brigade, in Khankala and Kalininskaya equipped with BTR
 19th Independent Motor-Rifle Brigade "Voronezh-Shumlinskaya", in Vladikavkaz
 20th Guards Independent Motor-Rifle Brigade "Carpathian-Berlin", in Volgograd equipped with BMP
 22nd Spetsnaz Brigade, in Bataysk
 33rd Independent (Mountain) Reconnaissance Brigade, in Botlikh equipped with MT-LBV
 34th Independent (Mountain) Motor-Rifle Brigade, in Zelenchukskaya equipped with MT-LBV
 56th Guards Independent Airborne Brigade, in Kamyshin
 100th Independent (Experimental) Reconnaissance Brigade, recently formed in Mozdok
 136th Guards Independent Motor-Rifle Brigade "Uman-Berlin", in Buynaksk equipped with BMP
 205th Independent Motor-Rifle Brigade, in Budyonnovsk equipped with MT-LBV
 4th Guards Military Base "Vapnyarsko-Berlin", in South Ossetia
 7th Military Base "Krasnodar", in Abkhazia
 102nd Red Banner Military Base, headquarters at Gyumri, Armenia
 73rd Independent Motor-Rifle Brigade, in Yerevan
 76th Independent Motor-Rifle Brigade, in Gyumri
 Missile and Artillery formations:
 1st Guards Rocket Brigade "Orsha", in Krasnodar Total: 12 9K720 Iskander.
 291st Artillery Brigade, in Maykop
 439th Guards MLRS Brigade "Perekop", in Znamensk
 943rd Multiple Rocket Launcher Regiment, in Maykop
 7016th Artillery Reserve Base, in Maykop
 573rd Independent Artillery Reconnaissance Battalion
 Air defense formations:
 67th Air-defence Missile Brigade, in Volgograd, equipped with the Buk missile system
 1138th Air-defence Command Center
 Radar formations:
 131st Independent Radio-technical Brigade, in Rostov-on-Don
 48th Independent Radio-Technical Battalion, in Vladikavkaz
 Engineering formations:
 11th Engineer Regiment, in Prokhladny
 57th Independent Engineer Battalion
 NBC-defence formations:
 118th Independent NBC-defence Battalion, in Frolovo
 860th Independent Flamethrower Battalion, in Oktyabrsky
 Signal formations:
 175th (Communications Hub) Signal Brigade "Luninetsko-Lipskaya"
 176th (Territorial) Signal Brigade
 234th Independent Signal Regiment
 148th Independent (Rear) Signal Battalion
 395th Independent Signal Battalion
 97th Independent Electronic Warfare Battalion, in Vladikavkaz
 1270th Independent Electronic Warfare Center, in Kovalevka
 Other formations:
 32nd Material Support Regiment, in Stavropol
 474th Transport Battalion, in Millerovo

Also located at Novorossiysk within the district's boundaries, but not under its command, was the 7th Guards Mountain Air Assault Division, part of the Russian Airborne Troops with their headquarters in Moscow.

Band
The Headquarters Military Band of the North Caucasus Military District was founded on 26 December 1962. Musicians have been repeated laureates and diploma recipients of all-army competitions of military bands, as well as a laureate of an international festival in Yugoslavia. It has also visited the Chechen Republic more than once, and in February 2002 attended a military parade of the United Group of Forces in Grozny. The unit consisted of 83 musician who were both military and civilian personnel.

Song and Dance Ensemble
The Song and Dance Ensemble of the North Caucasian Military District was created in 1943 and has a permanent composition of 50 musicians. Every fifth member of the collective is an honored artist of some profession. There is also a composition of 5-10 conscripts. Its main task is to help the commanders of units maintain the moral and psychological spirit of their personnel. In the period between 1999 and 2003, the ensemble performed 200 concerts in the area of the counter-terrorist operation in the North Caucasus.

Museum
On 1 November 1967, a museum dedicated to the military history of the North Caucasian Military District was opened in the House of Officers of the district. Since October 2010, it has served as the military history museum of the Southern Military District.
In the memorial hall of the new museum, there is a relief map of the formwe district, opposite to which there are marble pylons with the names of two and three time Heroes of the Soviet Union. 
The Civil War hall reflects on the history of the creation and formation of the North Caucasian Military District.

Notes

References
 
 
    Improved version of 2004 work with many inaccuracies corrected.
 - regarding Georgia and South Ossetia
  – Located in fond 949, opus 1, file 2 of the Central Archives of the Russian Ministry of Defence
 Scott, Harriet and William F. Russian Military Directory, 2002

External links 
 Michael Holm https://www.ww2.dk/new/air%20force/army/vvsskvo.htm - Air Forces of the North Caucasus Military District, 1945-1990s

Military districts of the Russian Federation
Military districts of the Soviet Union
Military units and formations established in 1918
Military units and formations disestablished in 2010
1918 establishments in Russia
North Caucasus